The U.S. Post Office Building in Selma, Alabama, also known as the Federal Building or United States Courthouse.

Architecture and history
The Beaux-Arts-style building was constructed in 1909 and designed by architects and engineers in the Office of the Supervising Architect under James Knox Taylor. It was built to house facilities of the United States District Court for the Southern District of Alabama, the United States Post Office and other federal agencies. In 1928 a one-story addition was added to the rear of the building, and the post office later moved to a new building on the other side of downtown.

The arch in front of the building was built in 1913 as a memorial to John Tyler Morgan and Edmund W. Pettus, Senators from Alabama. The design was by Hugh A. Price, a monument designer from Chicago.

It was listed, for its architecture, in the National Register of Historic Places on March 26, 1976.

See also 
List of United States post offices

References 

National Register of Historic Places in Dallas County, Alabama
Buildings and structures in Selma, Alabama
Government buildings completed in 1909
Beaux-Arts architecture in Alabama
Selma
Courthouses in Alabama
Courthouses on the National Register of Historic Places in Alabama
1909 establishments in Alabama